William Madison "Matty" Bell (February 22, 1899 – June 30, 1983) was an American football player, coach of football and basketball, and college athletics administrator. He played for Centre, captain of its 1918 team. He served as the head football coach at the Haskell Institute (1920–1921), Carroll College in Waukesha, Wisconsin (1922), Texas Christian University (1923–1928), Texas A&M University (1929–1933), and Southern Methodist University (1935–1941, 1945–1949), compiling a career college football record of 147–88–17. His 1935 SMU Mustangs, which have been recognized as a national champion, went 12–0 in the regular season before losing to Stanford in the Rose Bowl.  Bell was also the head basketball coach at Texas Christian for six seasons from 1923 to 1929, tallying a mark of 71–41.  He was inducted into the College Football Hall of Fame as a coach in 1955.  After retiring from coaching following the 1949 season, Bell served as the athletic director at Southern Methodist until 1964.  He died in 1983 in Dallas, Texas.

Navy service
During World War II, Bell took a leave of absence from coaching to serve in the aviation branch of the United States Naval Reserve from 1942 to 1945. On June 12, 1942, he was sworn in as a lieutenant commander, and reported to Annapolis. Subsequently, he became the athletic director at the Navy Pre-Flight School on the campus of the University of Georgia and rose to the rank of commander. After the war, he returned to SMU as head coach.

Head coaching record

Football

References

External links
 
 

1899 births
1983 deaths
American football ends
Carroll Pioneers football coaches
Centre Colonels football players
Haskell Indian Nations Fighting Indians football coaches
SMU Mustangs athletic directors
SMU Mustangs football coaches
Texas A&M Aggies football coaches
TCU Horned Frogs football coaches
TCU Horned Frogs men's basketball coaches
College Football Hall of Fame inductees
United States Navy officers
United States Navy reservists
Players of American football from Fort Worth, Texas
Coaches of American football from Texas
Basketball coaches from Texas
Military personnel from Texas